"Hang On" is a song by the band Weezer. The song impacted radio on February 15, 2011. It is the seventh track and second single from their eighth studio album, Hurley. The album version of "Hang On" is co-written by Rick Nowels and features Canadian actor Michael Cera on backing vocals and pseudo-mandolin. The single version features no mandolin, and contains a harder sound.

Reception
Alternative Press calls the song one of the best off of Hurley, along with the song "Run Away", praising its uniqueness and commenting "sounding as musically lively and lyrically honest as any cut off Pinkerton". Rolling Stone regards the song as "power-ballad heaven".

Track listing

"Hang On" - 3:33

Personnel
Rivers Cuomo – lead guitar, lead vocals
Patrick Wilson – percussion
Brian Bell – rhythm guitar, backing vocals
Scott Shriner – bass guitar, backing vocals
Michael Cera - backing vocals, mandolin
Tony Berg - hurdy-gurdy

References

Weezer songs
2011 singles
Songs written by Rivers Cuomo
2010 songs
XL Recordings singles
Songs written by Rick Nowels
2010s ballads
Pop ballads
Alternative rock ballads